The 2022 Liga de Balompié Mexicano season was the 3rd professional season of the most important league of competitions organized by the Asociación Nacional del Balompié Mexicano, a Mexican football federation affiliated with CONIFA. The season began on 1 April 2022 and finished on 2 July 2022.

Offseason Changes
 Eight teams will participate in the league.
 Inter de Amecameca and Mezcaleros de Oaxaca joined the league as expansion teams.
 Jaguares de Jalisco and Real Tlamazolan withdrew from the league.
 Two tournaments will be played in the season: League and Cup. In the league, the championship will be awarded to the team that scores the most points in the regular season. While the Cup will be played by direct elimination between the eight clubs in the division. The two champions will play a match to determine the best club of the season.
 On May 16, 2022 Atlético Capitalino was expelled from the league for not complying with the rules of the competition.

Teams
{{Location map+ |Mexico |width=500|float=right |caption=Liga de Balompié Mexicano Official Teams |places=

League

Standings

Positions by Round

Results

Regular season statistics

Top goalscorers 
Players sorted first by goals scored, then by last name.

Hat tricks

Cup 
The league decided to hold a cup tournament between four teams participating in the league.

Semi–finals

Final

Champions Trophy
The champions trophy will face league winners against cup winners.

See also 
Liga de Balompié Mexicano

References

External links
 Official website of LBM 

Liga de Balompié Mexicano
1